The women's 1 metre springboard diving competition at the 2014 Asian Games in Incheon was held on 1 October at the Munhak Park Tae-hwan Aquatics Center.

Schedule
All times are Korea Standard Time (UTC+09:00)

Results

References 

Results

External links
Official website

Diving at the 2014 Asian Games